Agriphila gerinella is a moth in the family Crambidae. It was described by Patrice J.A. Leraut in 2012. It is found in Morocco.

References

Crambini
Moths described in 2012
Moths of Africa